Ian Freer is a British non-fiction author, film magazine editor and newspaper writer who has written several books relating to films. 

He is currently employed with the film magazine Empire and is one of their senior reviewers as well as the assistant editor of the magazine.

He is also a writer for several newspapers, including the Daily Telegraph and the Guardian covering film subjects and film history.

In 2010, he appeared in the documentary comedy film The People vs. George Lucas.

Works
In 2007, he authored The Complete Spielberg, a guide to the films of Steven Spielberg.

In 2009, he authored a title Movie Makers: 50 Iconic Directors from Chaplin to the Coen Brothers, published by Quercus that covers film directors including Charlie Chaplin, Quentin Tarantino, and David Lean among others.

References

British film critics
Living people
Year of birth missing (living people)
Place of birth missing (living people)